The Roman Catholic Diocese of Dundee is a diocese located in the city of Dundee in the Ecclesiastical province of Durban in South Africa.

History
 June 23, 1958: Established as Apostolic Prefecture of Volksrust from Diocese of Bremersdorp, Swaziland, Metropolitan Archdiocese of Durban and Diocese of Lydenburg
 November 19, 1982: Promoted as Diocese of Dundee

Special churches
The Cathedral is the Cathedral of St. Francis of Assisi in Dundee.

Leadership
 Prefect Apostolic of Volksrust (Roman rite) 
 Fr. Christopher Ulyatt, O.F.M. (1958 – 1969)
 Fr. Marius Joseph Banks, O.F.M. (1969 – 1983)
 Bishops of Dundee (Roman rite)
 Bishop Michael Vincent Paschal Rowland, O.F.M. (1983 – 2005)
 Bishop Graham Rose (since 2008)

See also
Roman Catholicism in South Africa

Sources
 GCatholic.org
 Catholic Hierarchy

Dundee
Christian organizations established in 1958
Roman Catholic dioceses and prelatures established in the 20th century
KwaZulu-Natal
1958 establishments in South Africa
 
Roman Catholic Ecclesiastical Province of Durban